DJ Static is the name used by a number of DJs around the world:
DJ Static (Canadian DJ) (born 1977), Canadian DJ and radio personality
DJ Static (Danish DJ), Danish DJ, producer and event organizer
Static Revenger, American DJ and producer
Statik Selektah (born 1982), American record producer and DJ